Tantoyuca Municipality is one of the 212 municipalities of the Mexican state of Veracruz. It is located in the state's Huasteca Alta region. The municipal seat is Tantoyuca, Veracruz.

In the 2005 INEGI Census, the municipality reported a total population of 97,949 (up from 89,492 in 1995), of whom 23,893 lived in the municipal seat. 
Of the municipality's inhabitants, 40,864 (47.92%) spoke an indigenous language, primarily Wastek (Huasteco).

The municipality of Tampico Alto covers a total surface area of 1,205.84 km2.

Settlements in the municipality
Tantoyuca (municipal seat; 2005 population 23,893)
San Sebastián (population 1,170) 
Corral Viejo (1,080) 
Ixcanelco (1,079)
El Lindero (966)

References

External links
Tantoyuca Web page of the Veracruz State Govt. Accessed 6 November 2008.

Municipalities of Veracruz